M65 or M-65 may refer to:

Military
 Iveco LMV, an Italian-designed four-wheel drive tactical vehicle in service with several countries
 M65 atomic cannon, a towed artillery piece
 M65 Jacket, a multi-temperate jacket designed for the US Armed forces
 M65 recoilless nuclear rifle, a nuclear warhead for recoilless rifles
 Soltam M-65, an Israeli mortar
 Tikka M65, a Finnish rifle

Transportation
 M65 motorway, a motorway in England
 M-65 (Michigan highway), a Michigan state highway
 Miles M.65 Gemini, a 1945 British twin-engined four-seat touring aircraft
 M65 (Durban), a road in Durban, South Africa

Other uses
 Envelope, size with dimensions 110mm × 220mm
 Messier 65, a spiral galaxy in the constellation Leo
 M 65, an age group for Masters athletics (athletes aged 35+)